Workshop of the Telescopes is a two-disc compilation album by the American band Blue Öyster Cult, released by Sony Music/Columbia Entertainment in 1995. All of the material on this album was recorded prior to the Imaginos sessions; some of it was previously only available on promo discs (marked (*)), and a few others were previously unavailable on CD (marked (+)).

The CD comes with an explanatory booklet outlining the development of Blue Öyster Cult and their rise to fame throughout the 1970s and 1980s.

The album served as a basis of the double-disc reissue of The Essential Blue Öyster Cult in 2012, sharing 21 tracks, substituting some tracks with their live counterparts.

Track listing

Disc one
"Cities on Flame with Rock and Roll"  – 4:03
"Transmaniacon MC"  – 3:20
"Before the Kiss, a Redcap"  – 4:58
"Stairway to the Stars"  – 3:43
"Buck's Boogie (Live)"  – 5:17
"Workshop of the Telescopes (Live)" (*)  – 3:46
"The Red and the Black (Live)" (*)  – 4:35
"7 Screaming Diz-Busters"  – 7:00
"Career of Evil"  – 4:07
"Flaming Telepaths"  – 5:23
"Astronomy"  – 6:15
"Subhuman (Live)"  – 7:30
"Harvester of Eyes (Live)"  – 5:00
"M. E. 262 (Live)"  – 8:17
"Born to be Wild" (+)  – 3:38 (Steppenwolf cover)

Disc two
 "Don't Fear the Reaper"  – 5:08
 "This Ain't the Summer of Love"  – 2:21
 "E.T.I. (Extra Terrestrial Intelligence)"  – 3:42
 "Godzilla"  – 3:41
 "Goin' Through the Motions"  – 3:12
 "Golden Age of Leather"  – 5:51
 "Kick Out the Jams (Live)"  – 3:12 (MC5 cover)
 "We Gotta Get Out of This Place (Live)"  – 4:33 (The Animals cover)
 "In Thee"  – 3:48
 "The Marshall Plan"  – 5:24
 "Veteran of the Psychic Wars"  – 4:48
 "Burnin' for You"  – 4:30
 "Dominance and Submission (Live)"  – 5:56
 "Take Me Away"  – 4:30
 "Shooting Shark"  – 7:09
 "Dancin' in the Ruins"  – 4:00
 "Perfect Water"  – 5:29

Some of these songs were later included on the remastered editions of BÖC's studio albums.

Personnel 
The album is a compilation encompassing Blue Öyster Cult from the early 1970s to 1986. It does not include material from 1988's Imaginos.

References

Blue Öyster Cult compilation albums
1995 compilation albums
Columbia Records compilation albums